USS Meriwether (APA-203) was a  that saw service with the US Army in World War II.

Meriwether was laid down 27 July 1944 by Kaiser Shipbuilding of Vancouver, Washington, launched 18 October 1944 and commissioned 4 November 1944.

Operational history

World War II
After a month of amphibious training off the California coast, Meriwether departed San Diego 8 January 1945 with Marine Corps replacements for Hawaii. Arriving on the 14th, she discharged her passengers and underwent further training in preparation for the Okinawa campaign.

Invasion of Okinawa

On 19 February, the attack transport began loading troops and equipment of the 10th Army and, on the 22d, sailed westward. Steaming via Eniwetok, Ulithi, Palau, and Leyte, she arrived off Okinawa early 1 April. After landing troops and equipment amidst frequent kamikaze attacks, one of which she helped splash on the 3rd, she departed for Saipan 15 April with wounded.

Discharging the casualties there on the 18th, she continued on to Pearl Harbor and San Francisco where she embarked Navy support personnel and got underway to return to Okinawa 6 June. She arrived 24 July, discharged her passengers and cargo, but due to air raid alerts and a typhoon, did not depart until 6 August.

After hostilities

At Guam on the 14th, she received word of the Japanese surrender and began loading cargo and troops of the 6th Marine Division for the initial occupation of the Tokyo Bay area. Landing them there on the 30th, she sailed for Saipan where she again loaded occupation forces, this time for Nagasaki.

On 15 October, Meriiwether was detached from occupation support duties and assigned to Operation Magic Carpet, returning servicemen to the United States. She continued such runs until the end of the year, when she joined the 19th Fleet.

Decommissioning
Meriwether was struck from the Navy Vessel Register along with at least 20 of her Haskell class sister ships on 1 October 1959, and transferred to the Maritime Administration. As a unit of the National Defense Reserve Fleet, she was berthed at Suisun Bay into 1969. She was later scrapped.

Decorations
Meriwether received one battle star for World War II service.

References
Meriwether (APA-203), DANFS Online
APA-203 Meriwether, Navsource Online

Haskell-class attack transports
Meriwether County, Georgia
World War II amphibious warfare vessels of the United States
Troop ships
Ships built in Vancouver, Washington
1944 ships